Anymore for Anymore is the debut solo album by Ronnie Lane, one of the founding members of Small Faces and Faces. The recording sessions, using Ronnie Lane's Mobile Studio, started in 1973 at his  farm in Wales with his new band Slim Chance.

Lane had originally wanted to rechristen the Small Faces with the name Slim Chance in 1969 after Steve Marriott left the group, but when Ron Wood and then Rod Stewart joined them soon after, the other band members vetoed the idea and instead opted to slightly amend their existing name to Faces.

The Anymore for Anymore album showcases a more rootsy, folk, and country music-influenced sound than Lane's Faces albums, although Lane had already flirted heavily with these musical styles on his own compositions for that group as early as 1970.

The carefree nature of the album's recording is illustrated by the fact that the title track was spontaneously recorded on the hillside overlooking Lane's farm, where the sound of nearby cattle and a light wind picked up by the recording microphones added further rural ambience to the track.

The track "Tell Everyone" was a re-recording of a Lane composition from the Faces' Long Player LP.

Reviewing the song "The Poacher" for The Guardian in 2012, George Chesterton, wrote: "Pop lyrics can aspire only to be poetic – they are not poetry in themselves – but the lines 'Bring me fish with eyes of jewels and mirrors on their bodies / Bring them strong and bring them bigger than a newborn child' come pretty close. Thanks to the strings and oboe of the refrain and Lane's warm strumming, the music is as simple and as transcendant as the message."

Track listing
Side one

Side two

Personnel
Ronnie Lane – guitar, bass, vocals
Graham Lyle – banjo, mandolin, guitar
Benny Gallagher – bass, guitar, accordion/squeeze box
Kevin Westlake – guitar
Billy Livsey - keyboards
Ken Slaven – violin
Steve Bingham – bass
Jimmy Jewell – saxophone
Bruce Rowland – drums
The Tanners of Montgomery – backing vocals
Jimmy Horowitz - string arrangement on "The Poacher"

Production
Producer: Ronnie Lane, Bruce Rowland on "Bye and Bye (Gonna See the King)" and "The Poacher", Glyn Johns on "Tell Everyone"
Recording engineers: Hugh Jones, Andy Knight
Artwork/sleeve Art: Paul Bevoir
Liner notes: Alberto Mitchell, Wayne Pernu

References

Ronnie Lane albums
1974 debut albums
Albums produced by Glyn Johns
Albums recorded in a home studio
Albums recorded at IBC Studios